Indian Deaf cricket team represents India in international deaf cricket arena. The team consists of players who are having hearing problems (deaf).

References

Cricket
India in international cricket
Deaf cricket teams
Deaf culture in India